Malcolm Kent Lohrey (3 September 1913 – 18 April 1992) was a New Zealand cricketer. He played in one first-class match for Canterbury in 1943/44.

See also
 List of Canterbury representative cricketers

References

External links
 

1913 births
1992 deaths
New Zealand cricketers
Canterbury cricketers